Pristimantis devillei is a species of frog in the family Strabomantidae.
It is endemic to Ecuador.
Its natural habitats are tropical moist montane forests, high-altitude shrubland, and tundra.
It is threatened by habitat loss.

References

devillei
Endemic fauna of Ecuador
Amphibians of Ecuador
Amphibians of the Andes
Amphibians described in 1880
Taxonomy articles created by Polbot